A list of films produced in Hong Kong in 1991:.

1991

External links
 IMDB list of Hong Kong films
 Hong Kong films of 1991 at HKcinemamagic.com

1991
Hong Kong
1991 in Hong Kong